Diva: The Singles Collection is a 2006 compilation album by Sarah Brightman. Alongside this album, Brightman released a DVD collection of her music videos on 3 October 2006 under the title of Diva: The Video Collection. The album marked the first time Brightman released a greatest hits album in the United States. It reached No. 1 on the Billboard Classical Crossover chart. 
In Japan, the album debuted and peaked at No. 2 with 77,000 copies sold on its first week of release, and became Japan's best-selling classical album of 2007. Subsequently, it was Japan's fifteenth best-selling international album of the 2000s decade. 
Diva was also the best-selling western album in South Korea in 2010, as it topped the international charts for 26 non-consecutive weeks. As of December 2013, it has been certified Quintuple Platinum in the country.

Track listing 
 "The Phantom of the Opera" (with Steve Harley) (Mike Batt, Charles Hart, Andrew Lloyd Webber, Richard Stilgoe) – 4:39
 "The Music of the Night" (Hart, Lloyd Webber, Stilgoe) – 5:25
 "Pie Jesu" (with Paul Miles-Kingston) (Lloyd Webber) – 3:58
 "Who Wants to Live Forever" (Brian May) – 3:56
 "Tu Quieres Volver" (Tonino Baliardo, Maurice Baliardo, Jacques Baliardo, Jahloul Bouchikhi, Nicolas Reyes, André Reyes, Paul Reyes) – 3:49
 "Just Show Me How to Love You" (with José Cura) (Baldan Bembo) – 4:00
 "Deliver Me" (Helena Marsh, Jon Marsh) – 4:01
 "Nella Fantasia" (Ennio Morricone) – 3:40
 "Scarborough Fair" (Frank Peterson, Paul Simon) – 4:12
 "A Whiter Shade of Pale" (Gary Brooker, Keith Reid) – 3:39
 "It's a Beautiful Day" (Christopher von Deylen, Frank Peterson) – 3:58
 "What You Never Know" (Stephan Moccio) – 3:25
 "A Question of Honour (Radio Mix)" (Frank Peterson) – 5:18
 "Time to Say Goodbye (Con te partirò)" (with Andrea Bocelli) (Peterson, Lucio Quarantotto, Francesco Sartori) – 4:06
 "Il Mio Cuore Va" (Japanese bonus track)"
 "Sarahbande (Japanese bonus track)"

Personnel 

Mike Batt – Lyricist, producer
Andrea Bocelli – Vocals
Sarah Brightman – Vocals, lyricist, producer, executive producer, concept
Gary Brooker – Lyricist
A. Cassella – Lyricist
Alex Christensen – Producer
José Cura – Vocals
Chiara Ferrau – Lyricist, photography
Simon Fowler – Photography
Esther Haase – Photography
Charles Hart – Lyricist
Laisa – Lyricist
Andrew Lloyd Webber – Lyricist, producer
Brian May – Lyricist
Paul Miles-Kingston – Choir master
Stephan Moccio – Lyricist
Ennio Morricone – Lyricist
David R. Murray – Producer
Frank Peterson – Lyricist, producer, executive producer, concept
Quarantotto – Lyricist
Keith Reid – Lyricist
A. Gilberto Reyes – Lyricist
Sartori – Lyricist
Richard Stilgoe – Lyricist
Christopher Von Deylen – Lyricist
Ellen Von Unwerth – Photography

Charts and certifications

Weekly charts

Sales and certifications

References

2006 compilation albums
Sarah Brightman albums
Albums produced by Frank Peterson